Patricia Walsh (born March 16, 1960) is a former Irish athlete, who competed in the discus at the 1984 Summer Olympics, and has also competed in the 4 × 100 metres relay.

External links
sports-reference.com

Living people
Irish female discus throwers
Athletes (track and field) at the 1984 Summer Olympics
Olympic athletes of Ireland
1960 births
Irish female athletes
World Athletics Championships athletes for Ireland
Tennessee Volunteers women's track and field athletes